The 2014 IAAF World Half Marathon Championships took place on March 29, 2014.  The races were held in Copenhagen, Denmark.  The essentially flat one-loop course was beginning and ending in the city centre by Christiansborg Castle.  Detailed reports on the event and an appraisal of the results were given both for the men's race and for the women's race.

Complete results were published for the men's race, for the women's race, for men's team, and for women's team.

Medallists

Race Results

Men's

Women's

Team results

Men's

Women's

Medal table (unofficial)

Participation
An unofficial count yields the participation of 201 athletes from 56 countries.

 (1)
 (2)
 (5)
 (1)
 (2)
 (1)
 (5)
 (1)
 (2)
 (1)
 (10)
 (8)
 (4)
 (10)
 (1)
 (9)
 (1)
 (1)
 (1)
 (6)
 (1)
 (5)
 (7)
 (10)
 (10)
 (2)
 (2)
 (2)
 (2)
 (1)
 (2)
 (3)
 (2)
 (1)
 (6)
 (5)
 (6)
 (4)
 (1)
 (2)
 (1)
 (6)
 (6)
 (1)
 (3)
 (1)
 (1)
 (4)
 (8)
 (5)
 (2)
 (3)
 (10)
 (1)
 (2)
 (1)

See also
 2014 in athletics (track and field)

References

World Athletics Half Marathon Championships
World Half Marathon Championships
Half
World Half Marathon Championships
International sports competitions in Copenhagen